Hippodamia glacialis, the glacial lady beetle, is a species of lady beetle in the family Coccinellidae. It is found in North America.

Subspecies
These four subspecies belong to the species Hippodamia glacialis:
 Hippodamia glacialis extensa Mulsant, 1850
 Hippodamia glacialis glacialis (Fabricius, 1775)
 Hippodamia glacialis lecontei Mulsant, 1850
 Hippodamia glacialis mackenziei Chapin

References

Further reading

External links

 

Coccinellidae
Articles created by Qbugbot
Beetles described in 1775
Taxa named by Johan Christian Fabricius